The little black serotine (Eptesicus andinus) is a species of insectivorous vesper bat. It is found in  Colombia, Ecuador, Peru, Venezuela, Bolivia and Brazil at elevations from 100 to 3300 m.

References

Eptesicus
Bats of South America
Mammals of Colombia
Mammals described in 1914
Taxa named by Joel Asaph Allen